Ellerslie is an unincorporated community and census-designated place (CDP) in Harris County, Georgia, United States. Ellerslie is a part of the Columbus, Georgia metropolitan area.

It was first listed as a CDP in the 2020 census with a population of 1,053.

History
A post office called Ellerslie has been in operation since 1828. The name of the community is believed to have origins from a character in the Waverley Novels written by Sir Walter Scott named Captain Ellerslie.

The community was struck by a tornado on March 3, 2019, bringing down several trees and damaging the roofs of some homes in the area. No injuries or fatalities occurred.

Geography 
Ellerslie is located along Alternate U.S. Route 27 and Georgia State Route 85, which run northeast to southwest through the city, leading southwest   to Columbus and northeast  to Waverly Hall. The two highways meet Georgia State Route 315 in the city to form a very short concurrency in the city limits. It is located in the Piedmont region of the state.

Demographics

2020 census

Note: the US Census treats Hispanic/Latino as an ethnic category. This table excludes Latinos from the racial categories and assigns them to a separate category. Hispanics/Latinos can be of any race.

Education 
The community is home to one of the seven schools in the county:
Pine Ridge Elementary School

References

External links 
 The Wire Road historical marker

Unincorporated communities in Harris County, Georgia
Census-designated places in Harris County, Georgia